Yunxia Road Station is an underground metro station in Ningbo, Zhejiang, China. It situates on the crossing of Hengchun Street and Huancheng West Road. Construction of the station started in December 2010 and it opened to service on September 26, 2015.

Exits 
Yunxia Road Station has 3 exits.

References 

Railway stations in Zhejiang
Railway stations in China opened in 2015
Ningbo Rail Transit stations